Zemetchino is the name of several inhabited localities in Russia.

Urban localities
Zemetchino, Penza Oblast, a work settlement in Zemetchinsky District of Penza Oblast

Rural localities
Zemetchino, Tambov Oblast, a selo in Kershinsky Selsoviet of Bondarsky District of Tambov Oblast